The discography of Combichrist, an American aggrotech and EBM band based in Oak Hill, Florida, consists of nine studio albums, one retrospective album, ten extended plays, and many compilation and remixes.

Albums

Studio albums

Compilations

EPs

Music videos

Other compilations

Remixes by Combichrist/Andy LaPlegua/DJ Scandy

Remixes of Combichrist

References

Electronic music discographies